"Conjugal Lewdness or, Matrimonial Whoredom" (later retitled "A Treatise Concerning the Use and Abuse of the Marriage Bed" for propriety) is a 1727 essay by Daniel Defoe.

The essay dealt primarily with contraception, comparing it directly with infanticide.  Defoe accomplished this through anecdotes, such as a conversation between two women in which the right-minded chides the other for asking for "recipes" that might prevent pregnancy.  In the essay, he further referred to contraception as "the diabolical practice of attempting to prevent childbearing by physical preparations."

Bibliography

References

External links

Works by Daniel Defoe
1727 essays
Birth control
Philosophy essays